Dmitri Yevgenyevich Saganovich (born 23 May 1998) is a Russian football player who plays for FC Volgar Astrakhan.

Club career
He made his debut in the Russian Football National League for FC Volgar Astrakhan on 22 August 2020 in a game against FC Chayka Peschanokopskoye.

References

External links
 
 Profile by Russian Football National League
 

1998 births
Sportspeople from Astrakhan
Living people
Russian footballers
Association football goalkeepers
FC Volgar Astrakhan players
Russian First League players
Russian Second League players